The discography of American singer Robin Thicke consists of 8 studio albums, 30 singles and 23 music videos. Thicke signed his first recording contract with Interscope Records as a teenager and found success as a songwriter, before he began concentrating on his career as a performer. In 2000, Thicke started recording his debut album, A Beautiful World, which was released in April 2003. The album debuted at number 152 on the US Billboard 200, selling 119,000 copies. The record also peaked at number 36 on the Mega Album Top 100 in the Netherlands. Two singles were released from the album; the first, "When I Get You Alone" became a top ten hit in the Netherlands and New Zealand. That single also peaked at number 17 in Australia and was certified gold by the Australian Recording Industry Association (ARIA). In 2006, Thicke released his second studio album The Evolution of Robin Thicke. The record debuted at number 5 on the US Billboard 200, topped it on the Billboard Top R&B/Hip-Hop Albums, and became a certified platinum by the Recording Industry Association of America (RIAA). The album also charted in France, the Netherlands, and the United Kingdom. The Evolution of Robin Thicke produced four singles, all of which charted on the Billboard Hot R&B/Hip-Hop Songs. "Lost Without U" became one of his biggest hits, peaking at number 14 on the US Billboard Hot 100 and spending 11 weeks atop the Billboard Hot R&B/Hip-Hop Songs.

Thicke's third studio album, Something Else was released in September 2008. The album peaked at number 3 on both the US Billboard 200, and on the Billboard Top R&B/Hip-Hop Albums charts. The album's first two singles, "Magic" and "The Sweetest Love", both became top 20 hits on the Billboard Hot R&B/Hip-Hop Songs. Sex Therapy: The Session was released in December 2009, peaking at numbers 9 and 2 on the US Billboard 200, and on the Billboard Hot R&B/Hip-Hop Albums, respectively. Its title track, the first of four singles from the album, became Thicke's second number-one R&B hit. His fifth studio album, Love After War was released in December 2011, peaking at number 22 on the US Billboard 200, while producing two singles: "Love After War" and "Pretty Lil' Heart".

Thicke has attained his biggest commercial success to date with the releases of his sixth studio album Blurred Lines and its respective singles. The album's eponymous lead single was a worldwide hit, becoming Thicke's first Billboard Hot 100 number-one single, and also topping the charts in countries such as Australia, Canada, New Zealand and the United Kingdom. Aided by the single's success, the album debuted at number one on the Billboard 200 and produced the follow-up singles "Give It 2 U", "For the Rest of My Life" and "Feel Good".

Albums

Studio albums

Singles

As lead artist

As featured artist

Other charted songs

Other appearances

Music videos

As lead artist

As featured artist

Notes

See also
 Robin Thicke production discography

References

External links
 Official website
 Robin Thicke at AllMusic
 
 

Discographies of American artists
Rhythm and blues discographies
Pop music discographies
Soul music discographies